Eric Goldberg is an American game designer who has worked primarily on role-playing games.

Career
For Simulations Publications, Incorporated (SPI), Eric Goldberg designed Commando, a man-to-man tactical combat game featuring character creation and skills. Goldberg also designed DragonQuest (1980), SPI's biggest roleplaying game and perhaps its first true roleplaying game. Goldberg also contributed to Chaosium's Thieves' World (1981). Goldberg and his long-time friend and SPI co-worker Greg Costikyan approached Dan Gelber about turning Gelber's RPG design called 'Paranoia' from a game he ran for his local group into a professional product. Gelber gave Goldberg and Costikyan his notes and they turned those ideas into a complete manuscript. During his time working at SPI, Goldberg also designed Eric Goldberg's KURSK which was subsequently published in 1980. This project was the 2nd Edition of SPI's original KURSK game (1971). In 1983, Goldberg took a job at West End Games as the new Vice President of Research & Development. Gelber, Costikyan, and Goldberg licensed Paranoia to West End Games,  and Ken Rolston helped rewrite the rules before it was published in 1984. Goldberg designed Tales of the Arabian Nights (1985), a paragraph-based storytelling board game.

Greg Costikyan and Goldberg left West End Games in January 1987, forming the short-lived Goldberg Associates. When West End Games declared bankruptcy in 1998, Costikyan and Goldberg tried to recover the rights to Paranoia; although West End's founder Scott Palter fought this, a judge gave the rights back to the creators in 2000. Costikyan and Goldberg licensed Paranoia to Mongoose Publishing, which began producing new books for the game in 2004. In writing the new edition called Paranoia XP, Varney, Goldberg and Costikyan reached out to and actively collaborated with Paranoia's online fan community through an official blog and through Paranoia-Live.net.

In 2019, Goldberg and Raph Koster founded a new company, Playable Worlds, and are currently developing an as-yet-unnamed MMORPG.

References

External links
 Eric Goldberg

American game designers
Living people
Place of birth missing (living people)
Role-playing game designers
Year of birth missing (living people)